Dakut is located in the province of Sulu, in the Bangsamoro Autonomous Region in Muslim Mindanao, of the Philippines.

Physical features

Dakut is classified by Philippine volcanologists as a potentially active volcano, with an elevation of 474 meters. It is situated on Tapul island.

Physical form and predominant rock type are not recorded.

Its tectonic setting is the Sulu Arc, an area of political unrest, with many understudied volcanic forms.

See also
List of active volcanoes in the Philippines
List of potentially active volcanoes in the Philippines
List of inactive volcanoes in the Philippines
Philippine Institute of Volcanology and Seismology
Volcano

External links
Philippine Institute of Volcanology and Seismology (PHIVOLCS), Dakut page

References

Volcanoes of Mindanao
Landforms of Sulu
Potentially active volcanoes of the Philippines
Stratovolcanoes of the Philippines